Cardinal Wiseman School may refer to:

 Cardinal Wiseman Catholic School, Birmingham, West Midlands, England
 Cardinal Wiseman Catholic School, Coventry, West Midlands, England
 The Cardinal Wiseman Catholic School, Greenford, Greenford, London, England